Vladimiroff is a Russian surname. Notable people with the surname include:

Christine Vladimiroff (1940–2014), American Benedictine nun
Pierre Vladimiroff (1893–1970), Russian ballet dancer and teacher

See also
 von Vladimiroff
 Vladimirov

Russian-language surnames
Patronymic surnames
Surnames from given names